In six-dimensional geometry, a runcic 5-cube or (runcic 5-demicube, runcihalf 5-cube) is a convex uniform 5-polytope. There are 2 runcic forms for the 5-cube. Runcic 5-cubes have half the vertices of runcinated 5-cubes.

Runcic 5-cube

Alternate names 
 Cantellated 5-demicube/demipenteract
 Small rhombated hemipenteract (sirhin) (Jonathan Bowers)

Cartesian coordinates 
The Cartesian coordinates for the 960 vertices of a runcic 5-cubes centered at the origin are coordinate permutations:
 (±1,±1,±1,±3,±3)
with an odd number of plus signs.

Images

Related polytopes 
It has half the vertices of the runcinated 5-cube, as compared here in the B5 Coxeter plane projections:

Runcicantic 5-cube

Alternate names 
 Cantitruncated 5-demicube/demipenteract
 Great rhombated hemipenteract (girhin) (Jonathan Bowers)

Cartesian coordinates 
The Cartesian coordinates for the 480 vertices of a runcicantic 5-cube centered at the origin are coordinate permutations:
 (±1,±1,±3,±5,±5)
with an odd number of plus signs.

Images

Related polytopes 
It has half the vertices of the runcicantellated 5-cube, as compared here in the B5 Coxeter plane projections:

Related polytopes 

This polytope is based on the 5-demicube, a part of a dimensional family of uniform polytopes called demihypercubes for being alternation of the hypercube family.

There are 23 uniform 5-polytopes that can be constructed from the D5 symmetry of the 5-demicube, of which are unique to this family, and 15 are shared within the 5-cube family.

Notes

References 
 H.S.M. Coxeter: 
 H.S.M. Coxeter, Regular Polytopes, 3rd Edition, Dover New York, 1973 
 Kaleidoscopes: Selected Writings of H.S.M. Coxeter, edited by F. Arthur Sherk, Peter McMullen, Anthony C. Thompson, Asia Ivic Weiss, Wiley-Interscience Publication, 1995,  
 (Paper 22) H.S.M. Coxeter, Regular and Semi Regular Polytopes I, [Math. Zeit. 46 (1940) 380-407, MR 2,10]
 (Paper 23) H.S.M. Coxeter, Regular and Semi-Regular Polytopes II, [Math. Zeit. 188 (1985) 559-591]
 (Paper 24) H.S.M. Coxeter, Regular and Semi-Regular Polytopes III, [Math. Zeit. 200 (1988) 3-45]
 Norman Johnson Uniform Polytopes, Manuscript (1991)
 N.W. Johnson: The Theory of Uniform Polytopes and Honeycombs, Ph.D. 
  x3o3o *b3x3o - sirhin, x3x3o *b3x3o - girhin

External links 
 
 Polytopes of Various Dimensions
 Multi-dimensional Glossary

5-polytopes